Fotbollsgalan is an official and annual Swedish sports awards ceremony honoring achievements in Swedish football. It is organised by Swedish Football Association and televised by TV4.

Merit categories

Current categories

Discontinued categories
Folkets lirare: 1995 to 2000
Swedish Football Personality of the Year: 2001 to 2003

Source:

See also
Allsvenskans stora pris

References

External links

Football in Sweden
1995 establishments in Sweden
November events
Recurring events established in 1995